The Brazilian red and white tarantula (Nhandu chromatus) is a tarantula species that is native to Brazil.

Description
The Brazilian red and white tarantula is noted for its white striped legs, beige to grey prosoma, and the reddish hairs on the opisthosoma. Males and females look the same until the ultimate (final) molt of the males. At this point the male will exhibit sexual dimorphism in the form of a duller coloration and legginess. Additionally males will gain an embolus on the pedipalps and tibial apophysis (mating hooks). The Brazilian red and white tarantula is a terrestrial species that will often make a burrow or make use of an abandoned burrow. The Brazilian red and white tarantula is reputed to be quite defensive with its urticating hairs.

Habitat
The Brazilian red and white tarantula is found in the tropical forests and savannahs of Brazil.

Pet trade
The Brazilian red and white tarantula is now fairly common in the pet trade, and it is popular among tarantula keepers for its beautiful coloration. The Brazilian red and white tarantulas large size, skittish demeanor, and urticating hairs means that it should not be handled except by an experienced person.

References
 Schultz, Stanley A. The Tarantula Keeper's Guide: Comprehensive Information on Care, Housing, and Feeding. Barrons, 2009.

External links
 
 

Theraphosidae
Spiders of Brazil